Lupin the Third Part II, also known as Shin Lupin III or simply as Lupin III for the American market, is a Japanese anime series based on the manga by Monkey Punch and is produced by Tokyo Movie Shinsha. The second season, which contains 25 episodes aired between April 10, 1978 and September 25, 1978 on NTV. The opening theme is Theme from Lupin III (Vocal Version) by Peatmac Junior while the ending theme is Love Theme (Vocal Version) by Ichirou Mizuki. Only the first episode of second season's English adaptation aired on Adult Swim on June 4, 2003, due to it being a replacement for episode 3, which the network skipped due to its Nazism content. In Canada, the entire second season of the series aired on G4techTV's Anime Current from June 12 to July 16, 2007.


Episode list

Notes

References
Specific

General

1978 Japanese television seasons
Lupin the Third Part II Season 2